The Chambers County Courthouse Square Historic District comprises the central portion of LaFayette, Alabama, centered on the Chambers County Courthouse. The courthouse is located in a square, surrounded by an early 20th century  commercial district on LaFayette Street, Alabama Avenue, First Street SE and First Avenue. The district includes 63 buildings, of which 45 are considered contributing features. It is described as one of the most intact courthouse squares in Alabama.

The district was added to the National Register of Historic Places on March 27, 1980.

References

External links

Historic districts on the National Register of Historic Places in Alabama
Chambers County, Alabama
Historic American Buildings Survey in Alabama
National Register of Historic Places in Chambers County, Alabama
Courthouses on the National Register of Historic Places in Alabama